

Giuseppe Battaglini (11 January 1826 – 29 April 1894) was an Italian mathematician.

He studied mathematics at the Scuola d'Applicazione di Ponti e Strade (School of Bridges and Roads) of Naples. In 1860 he was appointed professor of Geometria superiore at the University of Naples. Alfredo Capelli and Giovanni Frattini were his Laurea students.

See also
8155 Battaglini

Notes

References
 E. D'Ovidio, Commemorazione del Socio Giuseppe Battaglini, Mem. Reale Accad. Lincei Cl. Sci. Fis. 1(5) (1895), 558–610.
 A. Capelli, Giuseppe Battaglini, Giornale di matematiche 20 (1894), 205-208.
 F.G. Tricomi, Matematici Italiani del Primo Secolo dello Stato Unitario, Mem. Acc. Sci. Torino Cl. Sci. Fis. Mat. Nat., serie VI, t. 1, (1962–66) 1–120.

External links

An Italian short biography of Giuseppe Battaglini at University of Turin

1826 births
1894 deaths
19th-century Italian mathematicians
Geometers
Scientists from Naples
Giornale di matematiche editors